Purani Mosque of Dewaitha was built by Sarkar Dewan Raja Daud Khan Zamindar in 1606 at Dewaitha village. Jama Masjid of Dewaitha is one of the oldest historic monuments in Ghazipur district.

Daud Khan built this mosque in the village before it was known as Daudpur Jama Masjid, but it is now known as Purani Masjid. The Purani Masjid was the third-largest mosque by area in Kamsar. The mosque campus is spread over one-half acre. When the mosque was built in 1606, its minaret was 62 feet in height, the tallest in Ghazipur and Kamsar. Later the minarets became weak so they were demolished and renovated in the 1890s. Now the minarets are 65 feet in height.

References

Ghazipur district
Mosques in Uttar Pradesh
Mughal mosques